Home Sweet Home is an English-language Ghanaian family television drama series that premiered in 2012 and is still running. This program portrays how a family relates to each other and the growth and the challenges they face.

Cast
Rama Brew
John Apea
Julia Apea
Kojo Dadson
Evelyn Addo
Douglas Fish Bone
Canelle Hope

References

Ghanaian television series
2010s Ghanaian television series
2012 Ghanaian television series debuts